National Highway 5 (NH5) is a primary national highway in India, running from West to East, connecting Firozpur in Punjab to the Sino-Indian border at Shipki La. The highway passes through Moga, Jagraon, Ludhiana, Mohali, Chandigarh, Panchkula, Kalka, Solan, Shimla, Theog, Narkanda, Kumarsain, and Rampur Bushahr and continues along the Sutlej River till its terminus near the Tibet border.

Route 

NH5 traverses the states of Punjab, Haryana, Himachal Pradesh and union territory of Chandigarh in India.

Punjab 
Firozpur, Moga, Jagraon, Ludhiana, Kharar, Morinda,
Mohali - Chandigarh border

Chandigarh 
Punjab border at Mohali, exits at Zirakpur in Punjab

Punjab 
Zirakpur - Haryana border

Haryana 
Punjab border - Panchkula, Surajpur, Pinjore, Kalka bypass - H.P. border

Himachal Pradesh 
Haryana border - Parwanoo, Solan, Shimla, Theog, Narkanda, Kumarsain, Rampur Bushahr, Chini, Shipki La at Sino-Indian border

Junctions  
 
  near Firozpur.
  near Firozpur
  near Talwandi Bhai
  near Moga
  near Moga
  near Doraha
  near Kharar
  near Kharar
  near Zirakpur
  near Zirakpur
  near Pinjore
  near Kumarhatti
  near Shimla
  near Theog
  near Sainj
  near Powari 
  near Khab.

See also 
 List of National Highways in India
 List of National Highways in India by state

References

External links 
 NH 5 on OpenStreetMap

National highways in India
National Highways in Himachal Pradesh
National Highways in Punjab, India
National Highways in Chandigarh
National Highways in Haryana
Transport in Firozpur